Placostylus, or flax snails, are a genus of very large, air-breathing land snails, terrestrial pulmonate gastropod molluscs in the family Bothriembryontidae.

The shells of the snails in this genus can be as large as 4.5 inches (11 cm) in maximum dimension.

Many species within this genus are now extinct.

Taxonomy 
Placostylus is the type genus of the family Placostylidae. It was placed within Placostylidae.

Breure et al. (2010) moved Prestonella and Bothriembryon to Placostylidae. Subsequently, Breure & Romero (2012) confirmed previous results from 2010 and they renamed Placostylidae to Bothriembryontidae.

Distribution
This genus of snails occurs in the Solomon Islands, Vanuatu, New Caledonia, Fiji, Lord Howe Island, and Northland in New Zealand. There are three species in New Zealand and no subspecies.

Species
In former classification, two subgenera were recognized:
subgenus Basileostylus Haas, 1935
subgenus Maoristylus Haas, 1935

Species within this genus include:
  † Placostylus abbreviatus (Gassies, 1871)
 Placostylus ambagiosus Suter, 1906
 Placostylus bivaricosus (Gaskoin, 1855)
 Placostylus bondeensis (Crosse & Souverbie, 1869)
 Placostylus caledonicus (Petit, 1845)
 Placostylus eddystonensis Pfeiffer, 1855
 Placostylus fibratus (Martyn, 1789) - type species
 Placostylus hongii (Lesson, 1830)
 Placostylus founaki (Hombron & Jacquinot, 1853): synonym of Placocharis founaki (Hombron & Jacquinot, 1847)
 Placostylus fraterculus Rensch, 1934
 Placostylus gracilis (Broderip, 1840)
 † Placostylus leoni Haas, 1935 
 Placostylus porphyrostomus Pfeiffer, 1851
 Placostylus priscus Powell, 1938
 Placostylus salomonis (Pfeiffer, 1853)
 Placostylus scarabus (Albers, 1854)
 † Placostylus senilis (Gassies, 1869)

Synonyms
 Placostylus albersi Dautzenberg & Bouge in Dautzenberg, 1923: synonym of Placostylus fibratus souvillei (Morelet, 1857) (nom. nov. pro Placostylus eximius Albers not Reeve)
 Placostylus alexander (Crosse, 1855): synonym of Placostylus fibratus alexander (Crosse, 1855)
 Placostylus alienus Pilsbry, 1893: synonym of Santacharis fuligineus (L. Pfeiffer, 1854) (original combination; junior synonym)
 Placostylus annibal (Souverbie, 1869): synonym of Placostylus caledonicus (Petit, 1845) (junior synonym)
 Placostylus bavayi (Crosse & Marie, 1868): synonym of Placostylus eddystonensis bavayi (Crosse & Marie, 1868)
 Placostylus bollonsi Suter, 1908 - New Zealand flax snail: synonym of Basileostylus bollonsi (Suter, 1908)
 Placostylus calus E. A. Smith, 1892: synonym of Eumecostylus calus (E. A. Smith, 1892) (original combination)
 Placostylus cleryi (Petit de la Saussage, 1850): synonym of Eumecostylus cleryi (Petit de la Saussaye, 1850)
 Placostylus cuniculinsulae Cox, 1872: synonym of Placostylus bivaricosus (Gaskoin, 1855) (junior synonym)
 Placostylus dorseyi Dall, 1910: synonym of Partula grisea Lesson, 1831
 Placostylus duplex (Gassies, 1871): synonym of Placostylus porphyrostomus porphyrostomus (L. Pfeiffer, 1853)
 Placostylus dupuyi Kobelt, 1890: synonym of Placostylus eddystonensis bavayi (Crosse & Marie, 1868) (junior synonym)
 Placostylus falcicula (Gassies, 1871): synonym of Placostylus fibratus fibratus (Martyn, 1784)
 Placostylus founaki (Rousseau, 1854): synonym of Placocharis founaki (Hombron & Jacquinot, 1847)
 Placostylus francoisi Mabille, 1895: synonym of Poecilocharis bicolor  (Hartman, 1889) (junior synonym)
 Placostylus gizoensis Clench, 1941: synonym of Placostylus bivaricosus (Gaskoin, 1855) (junior synonym)
 Placostylus goulvainensis Kobelt, 1891: synonym of Placostylus porphyrostomus smithii Kobelt, 1891 (junior synonym)
 Placostylus guestieri (Gassies, 1869): synonym of Placostylus fibratus guestieri (Gassies, 1869)
 Placostylus guppyi E. A. Smith, 1892: synonym of Placocharis guppyi (E. A. Smith, 1892) (original combination)
 Placostylus hienguensis Crosse, 1871: synonym of Placostylus eddystonensis (L. Pfeiffer, 1855) (junior synonym)
 Placostylus houailouensis Dautzenberg, 1901: synonym of Placostylus fibratus alexander (Crosse, 1855) (junior synonym)
 Placostylus kanalensis (L. Pfeiffer, 1877): synonym of Placostylus fibratus alexander (Crosse, 1855) (junior synonym)
 Placostylus layardi Kobelt, 1891: synonym of Placostylus bondeensis rossiteri (Brazier, 1881) (junior synonym)
 Placostylus leucolenus Crosse, 1896: synonym of Placostylus fibratus fibratus  (Martyn, 1784)
 Placostylus loyaltyensis (Souverbie, 1879): synonym of Leucocharis loyaltyensis (Souverbie, 1879)
 Placostylus manni Clapp, 1923: synonym of Placocharis manni (Clapp, 1923) (basionym)
 Placostylus mariei (Crosse & P. Fischer, 1867): synonym of Placostylus porphyrostomus mariei (Crosse & P. Fischer, 1867)
 Placostylus miltocheilus Reeve, 1848: synonym of Aspastus miltocheilus (Reeve, 1848)
 Placostylus ouveanus (Mousson, 1869): synonym of Placostylus fibratus ouveanus (Mousson, 1869)
 Placostylus palmarum (Mousson, 1869): synonym of Placocharis palmarum (Mousson, 1869)
 Placostylus paravicinianus B. Rensch, 1934: synonym of Placocharis paravicinianus (B. Rensch, 1934) (original combination)
 Placostylus pseudocaledonicus (Montrouzier in Crosse, 1859): synonym of Placostylus scarabus (Albers, 1854) (junior synonym)
 Placostylus pyrostomus (L. Pfeiffer, 1860): synonym of Santacharis salomonis (L. Pfeiffer, 1852) (junior synonym)
 Placostylus remotus Hedley, 1898: synonym of Partula remota (Hedley, 1898) (original combination)
 Placostylus sanchristovalensis (Cox, 1870): synonym of Eumecostylus sanchristovalensis (Cox, 1870)
 Placostylus savesi Crosse, 1886: synonym of Placostylus eddystonensis savesi Crosse, 1886
 Placostylus saxtoni Kobelt, 1891: synonym of Placostylus caledonicus (Petit, 1845) (junior synonym)
 Placostylus scottii (Cox, 1873): synonym of Eumecostylus scottii (Cox, 1873)
 Placostylus seemanni (Dohrn, 1861): synonym of Euplacostylus seemanni (Dohrn, 1861)
 Placostylus singularis (Morelet, 1857): synonym of Placostylus porphyrostomus porphyrostomus (L. Pfeiffer, 1853) (junior synonym)
 Placostylus sinistrorsa (Crosse, 1884): synonym of Placostylus fibratus ouveanus (Mousson, 1869) (based on unavailable original name)
 Placostylus smithii Kobelt, 1891: synonym of Placostylus porphyrostomus smithii Kobelt, 1891 (basionym)
 Placostylus souvillei (Morelet, 1857): synonym of Placostylus fibratus souvillei (Morelet, 1857)
 Placostylus stutchburyi (L. Pfeiffer, 1860): synonym of Placocharis stutchburyi (L. Pfeiffer, 1860)
 Placostylus superfasciatus (Gassies, 1871): synonym of Placostylus fibratus fibratus (Martyn, 1784) (junior synonym)
 Placostylus unicus B. Rensch, 1934: synonym of Eumecostylus unicus (B. Rensch, 1934) (original combination)

References

External links 

 Fabrice M. Brescia, Christine M. Pöllabauer, Murray A. Potter & Alastair W. Robertson, A review of the ecology and conservation of Placostylus (Mollusca: Gastropoda: Bulimulidae) in New Caledonia; Molluscan Research 28(2): 111–122; ISSN 1323-5818
 Powell A. W. B., New Zealand Mollusca, William Collins Publishers Ltd, Auckland, New Zealand 1979 
 Flax snail on Department of Conservation (New Zealand) website

 
Gastropod genera